Paracymoriza flavicaput is a moth in the family Crambidae. It was described by Snellen in 1901. It is found on Java.

References

Acentropinae
Moths described in 1901